Kelly Sarah Anderson (born 4 February 1983) is a New Zealand former cricketer who played as a right-arm medium bowler. She appeared in six One Day Internationals and two Twenty20 Internationals in 2011. She played domestic cricket for Northern Districts, Auckland and Canterbury.

References

External links
 
 

1983 births
Living people
Cricketers from Auckland
New Zealand women cricketers
New Zealand women One Day International cricketers
New Zealand women Twenty20 International cricketers
Northern Districts women cricketers
Auckland Hearts cricketers
Canterbury Magicians cricketers